The South Fork Salmon River is an  tributary of the Salmon River in Idaho and Valley Counties in central Idaho. The river drains a rugged, lightly populated wilderness watershed in the Salmon River Mountains. It is the second-largest tributary of the Salmon River, after the Middle Fork.

Geography
About midway along its course, it is joined by its two main tributaries – the East Fork South Fork Salmon River from the east and the Secesh River from the west.

History
The Native Americans living along the river were the Nez Perce, Shoshone, Bannock and Paiute. The river and its valley were used largely for fishing, hunting, and gathering, while local hot springs provided camping sites during the winter.

The first recorded Europeans to see the South Fork may have been a group of mountain men working under the American Fur Company in 1831. They crossed the upper part of the river while reconnoitering the western part of the Salmon River system for good beaver streams. In the 1860s, prospectors discovered gold on the South Fork, leading to the initial settlement of the drainage by Westerners. After the gold rush faded, some miners stayed on as homesteaders and ranchers.

The drainage was heavily logged from the 1940s to the mid-1960s, when an estimated 320 million board feet of timber was taken from the basin.

Ecology
The South Fork is an important habitat for Chinook salmon, Westslope cutthroat trout, bull trout and steelhead trout and has been designated critical habitat for salmon. Although the aquatic habitat in the South Fork drainage is considered good, some tributaries have been damaged by logging, mining, and road-building activities, which has increased the sediment load in the river. About  of backcountry roads in the drainage have been decommissioned and are undergoing restoration by the U.S. Forest Service.

Plant communities in the South Fork drainage range from grassland and shrubland, Ponderosa pine, Douglas fir and Grand fir forests at lower elevations, to subalpine fir, lodgepole pine, whitebark pine and aspen at mid to high elevations. Among large mammals, the watershed is home to Rocky Mountain elk, white-tailed deer, mule deer, black bear, cougar, mountain goat, bighorn sheep and gray wolf. The area has over 200 confirmed species of resident and migratory birds.

Hydrology
Mean monthly discharge rates for the South Fork are displayed in the below graph.

Monthly discharges at Mackay Bar (cfs)

Recreation
Although not as frequently run as the Middle Fork, the South Fork is also well known for challenging whitewater. Because of their relatively pristine condition, the South Fork and its tributary, the Secesh are being considered for inclusion in the National Wild and Scenic Rivers system.

See also
List of rivers of Idaho

References

Rivers of Idaho
Tributaries of the Salmon River (Idaho)
Rivers of Valley County, Idaho
Rivers of Idaho County, Idaho